The 2012 United Bowl was the fourth title game of the Indoor Football League (IFL). It was played on July 14, 2012, at the Sioux Falls Arena in Sioux Falls, South Dakota. The top seed in the United Conference, the Sioux Falls Storm, defeated their Intense Conference counterpart Tri-Cities Fever, by a score of 59–37.

Road to the United Bowl

2012 Indoor Football League season
United Bowl
2012 in sports in South Dakota
Tri-Cities Fever
Sioux Falls Storm
Sports competitions in South Dakota
July 2012 sports events in the United States